Alfonso Osuna, Jr. (born August 10, 1965), is a former professional baseball player who pitched in the major leagues from 1990 to 1994 and 1996. He played for the Houston Astros, Los Angeles Dodgers and San Diego Padres.

See also
 Houston Astros award winners and league leaders

External links
 or Retrosheet, or Venezuelan Winter League

1965 births
Living people
Baseball players from California
Albuquerque Dukes players
Asheville Tourists players
Auburn Astros players
Cerritos Falcons baseball players
Columbus Mudcats players
Houston Astros players
Las Vegas Stars (baseball) players
Los Angeles Dodgers players
Major League Baseball pitchers
Navegantes del Magallanes players
American expatriate baseball players in Venezuela
Norfolk Tides players
Osceola Astros players
Rio Grande Valley White Wings players
San Diego Padres players
Baseball players from Inglewood, California
Tucson Toros players
Stanford Cardinal baseball players
Mercuries Tigers players
Taichung Agan players
American expatriate baseball players in Taiwan
Anchorage Bucs players
Alaska Goldpanners of Fairbanks players